

Men's 50m EAD Freestyle - Final

Men's 50m EAD Freestyle - Heats

Men's 50m EAD Freestyle - Heat 01

Men's 50m EAD Freestyle - Heat 02

Men's 50m EAD Freestyle - Heat 03

Swimming at the 2006 Commonwealth Games